Roadwars is the first arcade game developed by Arcadia, the short-lived arcade game division of Mastertronic. The home computer versions were developed by Binary Design and published by Melbourne House, who had recently been acquired by Mastertronic. Versions of the game released in the US were distributed by Electronic Arts.

Plot
The player drives a Battlesphere, an ovoid mobile weapon armed with a laser cannon and a protective shield. Battlespheres ensure the stability of the spaceways between the moons of the planet Armageddon by removing destructive debris. The magnetic side panels which keep the vehicles on the spaceways are malfunctioning and can not only delay but completely destroy a Battlesphere.

Gameplay
Roadwars is an arcade-like game which can be played with one or two players, and uses a joystick.

Reception
In 1989, Dragon gave the game 3½ out of 5 stars.

References

External links
Roadwars at GameSpot
Roadwars at GameFAQs
Roadwars review
Review in Info

1987 video games
Amiga games
Atari ST games
Binary Design games
Commodore 64 games
Video games developed in the United Kingdom
ZX Spectrum games